In the United States, a slow zone is an area where a train is forced to slow down for either structural, construction, power, signal, or track problems. Notification to train crews is referred to as a "slow order."

In the United Kingdom this is called a speed restriction.

See also
 Trains
 Rail tracks
 Rail speed limits in the United States

Railway signalling